Seminole, West Virginia may refer to the following places in West Virginia:
Seminole, Harrison County, West Virginia
Seminole, Summers County, West Virginia